Picratol is a high explosive mixture, comprising 52% 'Explosive D' and 48% TNT. It has a detonation velocity of approximately 6,972 metres per second. Picratol has no civilian applications. It was exclusively intended for military use and was especially popular during the Second World War. The basic advantage of Picratol is its insensitivity to shock. As a result, it proved useful as the main explosive filling in armour-piercing shells and aerial bombs.

Picratol is an obsolete explosive and is therefore unlikely to be encountered, except in the form of legacy munitions and unexploded ordnance.

External links
 Additional information re. Picratol

Explosives